Southbridge refers to the following rail lines:
Southbridge Branch, New Zealand
Southbridge Branch (New England) in Connecticut and Massachusetts, United States